Helter Skelter is one of the longest running dance music promoters in the UK. It is one of the few remaining rave music brands which promotes early underground styles of electronic dance music, as opposed to the more mainstream house music clubs that followed during the 1990s.

History
The Helter Skelter organisation was founded in September 1989 in the midst of the acid house party era by David Pratley and his wife Penny. They were inspired by the early acid bungalow clubs such as Codys and Lava and the M25 motorway orbital raves such as the Sunrise events. Helter Skelter's first event was an illegal outdoor rave but subsequent nights have been held in nightclubs.

After this, following the lead taken by fellow rave promoters Dreamscape, Helter Skelter began hosting events at the 3,000 capacity Sanctuary Music Arena in Milton Keynes. The Milton Keynes events underwent an expansion in the mid-1990s, using the roller rink adjacent to The Sanctuary, expanding the capacity to 8,000. Between the two arenas, an outdoor complex was created, which had a Sony PlayStation zone, free fairground rides, cafés and other recreational facilities. 

The success of the double-arena parties prompted Helter Skelter to organize Energy '97 - The Carnival of Dance. The festival took place at Turweston Aerodrome in Northamptonshire (now the site of the Gatecrasher Summer Sound System festivals). The festival sold out, attracting 18,000 revelers. Ten huge marquees played genres of dance music including  drum and bass, techno, house music and hardcore. The event had 85 of the UK's best artists, DJs and MCs and was the biggest and best Helter Skelter to date.

Helter Skelter in the 2000s
After a year out, the team reunited and Helter Skelter returned with an event at the 4,500 capacity venue Bowlers in Trafford, Manchester, in association with the Northern dance music organisation, Compulsion. Helter Skelter also returned to the Sanctuary Music Arena in Milton Keynes, but with a new music policy. Pratley collaborated with the event management team from Club Sidewinder and introduced specialist drum and bass events, branded as Accelerated Culture. The events featured drum and bass artists and DJs, including Kosheen, Roni Size, Shy FX, Craze, Grooverider, Hype and Fabio, many of whom have played for Helter Skelter previously.

Other branding included "Deja Vu" which is the identity for dedicated old skool retrospective events and "Human Traffic" for its upfront hardcore parties.

Helter Skelter and Sidewinder were invited by the major superclub promoter, Godskitchen, to host a 5,000 capacity Accelerated Culture arena at its first Global Gathering festival, held in summer 2001, and has appeared at every Global Gathering since. Utilising the super club's 2,000 capacity home venue CODE, Helter Skelter's relationship with Godskitchen continued as the rave promoter staged a series of nights in Birmingham, returning to the city for the first time since the mid-1990s.

Since the closure of the Sanctuary Music Arena in 2004, Helter Skelter is without a regular venue but continues to run one-off parties. It has returned twice to Milton Keynes, continued with the Accelerated Culture brand in Birmingham and brought drum and bass and old school hardcore to a predominantly house music-orientated Ibiza.

In 2005, Helter Skelter teamed up with Ministry of Sound to release a compilation CD, Hardcore Classics, mixed by Billy Daniel Bunter and Slipmatt. Further compilations followed: United In Hardcore (2006), a versus mix with Raindance in Hardcore (2007) and Billy Daniel Bunter and Slipmatt, Helter Skelter & Raindance Present The Sound Of Hardcore (2009).

See also
List of electronic music festivals

References

External links
 https://www.facebook.com/HelterSkelterOrganisation?ref=hl
 https://www.twitter.com/1HelterSkelter
 Helter Skelter Rave

Helter Skelter downloads
 https://www.facebook.com/notes/907108779307825/

Rave culture in the United Kingdom
Music festivals in England
Rave
Electronic music event management companies